The 1849 Rhode Island gubernatorial election was held on April 4, 1849.

Incumbent Whig Governor Elisha Harris did not run for re-election. Whig nominee Henry B. Anthony defeated Democratic nominee Adnah Sackett and Free Soil nominee Edward Harris.

General election

Candidates
Adnah Sackett, Democratic, manufacturer of jewelry, nominee for Governor in 1848
Edward Harris, Free Soil, manufacturer
Henry B. Anthony, Whig, editor of the Providence Journal

Results

References

1849
Rhode Island
Gubernatorial